Humay Award was an Azerbaijani national achievement award, established in 1993 by the Baku International Cultural Society and was active until 2019.

History 
The first award ceremony was held at the Gulustan Palace in March 1994. For the first three years, a ceramic figurine was presented as an award made by artist . Starting after the forth year, a bronze statuette was made by the artist .

For the first few years, the Humay Award was awarded in only a few categories, including in music, cinema, theatre, fine arts, and literature. Subsequently, new nominations were added, including television, architecture, journalism, sport, tourism, “best music video”, book publishing, science, dance, "the art of national mugham”, "the art of photography", and "the best project in the Azerbaijani Internet".

Music conductor Yalchin Adigezalov was the first awardee of "best conductor of the year" in 1993. Other early awardees in 1994 included actor ; actor Alakbar Huseynov; visual artist Farman Gulamov; and music composer .

References 

Azerbaijani awards
1993 establishments in Azerbaijan
Awards established in 1993